The Route Fire was a wildfire that burned during the 2022 California wildfire season, along Interstate 5 near the community of Castaic in Los Angeles County, California during a dramatic state-wide heatwave in late August and early September, 2022. At least seven firefighters sustained heat-related injuries, while two structures were destroyed and  burned.

Events

Context 

Southern California was experiencing a significant heatwave at the time. Conditions at the time were very dry and hot which were ingredients to create a fire like this one. On August 31, 2022, at 1:48 PM local time the fire began.

August 31 

When the fire began, temperatures had reached well over 100 degrees. A few minutes after it began, it burned about 60 acres. Nearly 40 minutes later, the fire more than doubled its size, which grew to about 165 acres. Later that evening, the fire soared into growth heading up to 4,625 acres with still 0% containment.

September 1 
The next day (September 1, 2022) the fire still expanded, but not by a lot. As the fire expanded to 5,208 acres, firefighters were able to contain the fire ever so slightly at a 12% containment. Eventually that evening, the fired had stopped expanding as the FD was able to advance containing about 27% of the fire.

September 2 
By the morning of September 2 containment reached 37%. By that evening it had grown to 56% containment.

September 3 
The morning of September 3, 2022 firefighters contained 71% of the fire. That containment grew to 87% before the next day.

September 4 
The containment grew up to 91% of this morning. Eventually before the next day it was reported to have a 96% containment.

September 5 
Around this point, the containment was up to 98% at 7:50 AM local time before the whole fire was completely extinguished.

Impact

Closures and evacuations 

Closures of Interstate 5 (both northbound & southbound) were reported. Traffic eventually piled up especially ones headed to the north as the Labor day weekend approached. The day after the fire ended (September 8, 2022) all of the northbound lanes were opened back & 2 southbound lanes opened as well. Eventually due to some poor road conditions, 2 of the right northbound lanes remained closed. At Vista Del Lago, southbound lanes were closed while northbound lanes were closed at Lake Hughes Road. For the Northbound 5, it wasn't until a few days later until all lanes were reopened.

The fire caused evacuation orders to be issued in nearby communities. Residents north of the fires (in Paradise Ranch Mobile Homes) were sheltered at Frazier Mountain High School.

Cause
The cause of the Route Fire is unknown

See also
2022 California wildfires

References

2022 California wildfires
Wildfires in Los Angeles County, California